Diospyros eriantha is a tree in the family Ebenaceae. The specific epithet  is from the Greek meaning "woolly flowers". D. eriantha is found in and around southern China, Indochina, Sumatra, Java, Borneo, Taiwan and the Philippines.

References

eriantha
Plants described in 1852
Trees of Japan
Trees of China
Trees of Taiwan
Trees of Vietnam
Trees of Malesia